Coconut Point is a strip mall located in Estero, Florida.

History
The Coconut Point mall opened on November 10, 2006. The mall is managed by the Simon Property Group and was designed by Hollywood, CA studio, 5+design. 

Anchors include Dillard's, SuperTarget, Best Buy, Office Depot, PetSmart, Total Wine & More, TJ Maxx, Michaels, Christmas Tree Shops, Home Centric, Ross Dress for Less, DSW, Ulta Beauty, West Elm, Party City, and Barnes & Noble, with former anchors include Regal Cinemas, OfficeMax, Pier 1 Imports, Tuesday Morning, Sports Authority, Bed Bath & Beyond and Old Navy.

In 2019, Stir Crazy closed, On May 19, 2020, Pier 1 Imports announced that it was asking the bankruptcy to close all stores, due to in the large part of the COVID-19 pandemic. On May 28, 2020, Tuesday Morning announced that 132 stores would close including the Coconut Point one. The stores closed in August 2020 and September 2020. In January 2021, Bed Bath & Beyond announced that it would close down 43 stores including the Coconut Point one. The store closed down in February 2021. The following month. Elite Home Game Rooms opened in the old Pier 1 Imports. A year later in May of 2022, Home Centric opened in the former Tuesday Morning. Christmas Tree Shops opened in the former Bed Bath & Beyond in August of 2022. In November of 2022, Regal Cinemas closed as part of the Cineworld bankruptcy filing.

References

External links
Official mall website

2006 establishments in Florida
Buildings and structures in Lee County, Florida
Shopping malls established in 2006
Shopping malls in Florida
Simon Property Group
Tourist attractions in Lee County, Florida